The 2009 Speaker of the Lebanese Parliament election was the 5th legislative speaker election since the implementation of the Taif Agreement, held on 25 June 2009 during the first session of the 23rd parliament. The incumbent Speaker Nabih Berri and head of the Amal Movement was re-elected to a fifth term.

Under the article 44 of the constitution, the speaker is elected at the start of each parliamentary cycle by an absolute majority of the deputies' vote. By convention, he is always a Shia Muslim.

Berri won the majority of the votes cast, receiving 90 votes and 70.3% out of 128 deputies.

Vote

References 

Lebanese legislative speaker elections
2009 in Lebanon
Nabih Berri